Lee Meng-chian is a Taiwanese footballer who plays as a defender for Taiwan Power Company.

He has represented Chinese Taipei in FIFA competition. He appeared in 2007 AFC Asian Cup qualification, competing in matches against Iran and Syria, as well as the 2004 Olympic qualifiers, playing in the preliminary round against Singapore.

References

External links
 
 

1981 births
Living people
Taiwanese footballers
Chinese Taipei international footballers
Association football defenders
Taiwan Power Company F.C. players
Place of birth missing (living people)